Khatib is a village in Jizan Province, in south-western Saudi Arabia, in the Arabian Sea.

References 

Populated places in Jizan Province